The low affinity sodium-glucose cotransporter also known as the sodium/glucose cotransporter 3 (SGLT3) or solute carrier family 5 member 4 (SLC5A4) is a protein that in humans is encoded by the SLC5A4 gene. It functions as a sugar sensor.

References

Further reading 

 
 
 
 
 
 

Solute carrier family